Liaquat Ali (born 6 August 1983, Okara) is a Pakistani athlete.

Background
Ali comes from Renala Khurd in Punjab. He is currently a professional athlete/coach in the sports department of Pakistan Army.

Career

National
Ali represents Pakistan Army in National competitions. Ali has consecutively played the Pakistan National games from 2006 to 2020 and currently holds the highest record of obtaining the most gold medals which is 59, with only one silver and one bronze in the events of 100m, 200m and 400m men's relay. He is currently also the member of the Athletics Federation of Pakistan which is the governing body of athletics in Pakistan.

International
Ali was awarded a wildcard for the 2012 Summer Olympics in London, UK where he represented Pakistan by competing in the 100m. He eventually came fourth in the men's 100-meter preliminary race with a time of 10.90 seconds. He missed third position by just 0.01 seconds and thus did not qualify for the next round. He won two Bronze medals for Pakistan at the 2010 South Asian games. Ali has participated in 17 international competitions and has secured a medal in each.
He has also represented Pakistan at the 2009 and 2013 World Athletics championships. 
Ali has completed the IAAF Level 1 coach course, He is now a certified IAAF coach.

Personal bests
 100 metres – 10:10, new national record in 2011

See also
 Afzal Baig, contemporary competitor in the same events

References

Living people
1983 births
Pakistani male sprinters
Athletes (track and field) at the 2012 Summer Olympics
Olympic athletes of Pakistan
Pakistan Army officers
Athletes from Punjab, Pakistan
Sportspeople from Okara, Pakistan
World Athletics Championships athletes for Pakistan
Athletes (track and field) at the 2018 Asian Games
South Asian Games bronze medalists for Pakistan
Asian Games competitors for Pakistan
South Asian Games medalists in athletics
21st-century Pakistani people